Sir William Heaton Horrocks  (25 August 1859 – 26 January 1941) was an officer of the British Army remembered chiefly for confirming Sir David Bruce's theory that Malta fever was spread through goat's milk.  He also contributed to the making safe of water, developing a simple method of testing and purifying water in the field.  Because of his work, he became the first Director of Hygiene at the War Office in 1919.

Early life and career
William Heaton Horrocks was the son of William Holden Horrocks of Bolton. Horrocks studied for his M.B. at Owen's College and passed his first M.B. examination in 1881. He received a Third Class Honours pass in Anatomy, and a Second Class in Physiology and Histology.

Previously a Surgeon on probation, Horrocks was promoted to Surgeon (the equivalent of Captain) on 5 February 1887. While serving in India, Horrocks married Minna Moore (died 1921), the daughter of the Reverend J.C. Moore of Connor, County Antrim on 27 September 1894 at Christ Church, Mussoorie. Together they had one son and one daughter.  His son Brian also joined the British Army, and became a leading corps commander during the Second World War.

Horrocks was promoted from Captain to Major on 5 February 1899.

Malta fever
In 1904 Horrocks was appointed as a member of the Royal Society's Mediterranean Fever Commission, to investigate the highly contagious disease Malta fever which was prevalent in the British colony of Malta.  Identified by Sir David Bruce in 1887, Malta fever was characterised by a low mortality rate but was of indefinite duration. It was accompanied by profuse perspiration, pain and occasional swelling of the joints.  In 1905 Sir Themistocles Zammit infected a goat with the bacteria Micrococcus Melitanensis which then caught Malta fever.  Horrocks was the first person to find the bacteria in goat's milk, thus identifying the method of transmission.

In attempting to settle the matter of who was responsible for the discovery, Bruce (who had served as chairman of the Commission, wrote to The Times newspaper:

Horrocks afterwards served as sanitary officer at the British colony of Gibraltar, where he noted that the incidence of Malta fever practically disappeared with the removal of Maltese goats from that place.

Later career
Horrocks was promoted to Lieutenant-Colonel on 19 May 1911, then in July was promoted Brevet Colonel dated 20 May, in recognition of his services. In 1915, Horrocks was honoured by becoming an Honorary Surgeon to King George V, commencing 6 November 1914, holding the appointment until 26 December 1917.

Horrocks also developed the "Horrocks Box", following his research into contamination of water. This device used sand filtration and chlorine sterilisation plants to provide a portable means of decontaminating water supplies. It proved of particular use during the First World War, when it kept the Allied forces largely free of water-borne disease. In addition to this he also developed means of removing poisons from water and assisted in the design of the first gas mask.

For his services in the war, Horrocks was honoured with appointments to a number of orders.  On 24 January 1917 he was appointed a Companion of the Bath. On 3 June 1918 (in the King's Birthday Honours) Horrocks was appointed a Knight Commander of the Order of Saint Michael and Saint George. He became the first Director of Hygiene at the War Office on 1 June 1919 in recognition of his expertise in military hygiene, this last period of active duty came to an end on 1 November 1919, and he relinquished his temporary rank of Brigadier-General.

Horrocks died on 26 January 1941 at the age of eighty-one, at Hersham in Surrey.  His funeral took place at St. Peter's Church, Hersham on 31 January with his son and daughter, among others, present.

Notes

References

Published works

1859 births
1941 deaths
Hygienists
Royal Army Medical Corps officers
Knights Commander of the Order of St Michael and St George
Companions of the Order of the Bath
People from Bolton
British Army personnel of World War I
Water filters
People from Hersham